Fabio Magni (born 12 March 1967) is an Italian equestrian. He competed at the 1992, 2000, 2004 and the 2008 Summer Olympics.

References

External links
 

1967 births
Living people
Italian male equestrians
Olympic equestrians of Italy
Equestrians at the 1992 Summer Olympics
Equestrians at the 2000 Summer Olympics
Equestrians at the 2004 Summer Olympics
Equestrians at the 2008 Summer Olympics
Sportspeople from Milan